Niya County (transliterated from the Uyghur), also from Mandarin Chinese as Minfeng County, is a county within the Xinjiang Uyghur Autonomous Region and is under the administration of the Hotan Prefecture. According to the 2002 census, it has a population of 30,000. The county is bordered to the north by Xayar County, to the east by Qiemo/Qarqan County, to the west by Yutian / Keriya County and to the south by Ngari Prefecture in Tibet.

The county seat is in the town of Niya, which is often referred to by the county name (Minfeng) as well. The Niya ruins are located 115 km north of Niya.

History
In the early 20th century, Aurel Stein carried out several expeditions in the area including exploration of the ancient Niya ruins.

In 1945, Minfeng Shezhiju was established. In 1947, the area became Minfeng County.

In 2012, the township of Yawatongguz (Yawatongguzi) was established.

In early 2015, a joint report issued by the Water Conservancy Office of Hotan prefecture and the regional Water Conservancy Department reported that up to 80 percent of the population of the county did not have access to clean drinking water.

In June 2015 in the lead-up to Ramadan, a beer festival was held in the county leading to condemnation from Dilxat Raxit, spokesman for the World Uyghur Congress.

In September 2015, residents of the county were reported to be subject to new rules concerning unacceptable given names for Uyghur children.

On December 8, 2019, County Communist Party Committee Vice Secretary and County Magistrate Aizezi Aili penned a criticism of the Uyghur Human Rights Policy Act.

Geography
The northern part of the county is located in the Taklamakan Desert and consists of large areas of sand dunes. The population centers on oases around rivers flowing down from the mountains in the southern part of the county.

Climate
, on average, Minfeng experienced blowing dust or sand on 189 days in a year and visibility below 4,800 meters for more than half of winter and summer as well as for thirty to forty percent of spring. The lowest spring time temperature recorded in Minfeng was -22 Celsius.

Administrative divisions
The county includes one town and six townships:

Town:
Niya Town (Niye;   / )
Townships:
Niya (Niye;   / ), Rokiya (Ruokeya, Rukiya;   / ), Salgozak (Salewuzeke, Salghozek;   / ), Yeyik (Yeyike, Yëyiq, Ya-li-ka, Yeh-i-k'o;   / ), Andir (Andi'er, Endir;   / , area of Andirlangar), Yawatongguz (Yawatongguzi, Yawa Tongguz;   / , area of Yawatongguzlangar)

Economy
The economy is primarily based on agriculture and livestock farming. Products of the county include corn, wheat, cotton and sheep wool. Industries in the county include electronics, agriculture technology, food processing, carpets and construction.

Demographics
As of 2015, Out of the 38,492 residents, 34,900 of the county were Uyghur, 3,509 were Han Chinese and 83 were from other ethnic groups.

As of 1999, 90.94% of the population of Niya (Minfeng) County was Uyghur and 8.91% of the population was Han Chinese.

Transportation
 China National Highway 315
 Tarim Desert Highway

Gallery

Notes

References

External links

 《农广天地》昆仑山下鸡羊鲜 20190218 | CCTV农业 

County-level divisions of Xinjiang
Hotan Prefecture